The Virginia Slims of Dallas inaugurated as the Maureen Connolly Memorial was a defunct WTA Tour affiliated women's tennis tournament  From 1979 through 1982 the event was known as the Avon Championships of Dallas. It was played from 1970 to 1989 and was held in Dallas, Texas in the United States and played on indoor carpet courts.

Martina Navratilova was the most successful player at the tournament, winning the singles competition nine times and the doubles competitions eight times, partnering Colombian Isabel Fernández de Soto, Dutchwoman Betty Stöve and American Billie Jean King once, American Anne Smith twice, and American Pam Shriver three times for her doubles successes.

Finals

Singles

Doubles

References
 WTA Results Archive

External links

 
Carpet court tennis tournaments
Indoor tennis tournaments
Defunct tennis tournaments in the United States
Virginia Slims tennis tournaments
Virginia Slims
Recurring sporting events established in 1972
Recurring sporting events disestablished in 1989
1972 establishments in Texas
1989 disestablishments in Texas
Women's tennis tournaments in the United States